The Trans List is a 2016 documentary film by Timothy Greenfield-Sanders for HBO, about eleven transgender Americans: Buck Angel, Kylar Broadus, Caroline Cossey, Laverne Cox, Miss Major Griffin-Gracy, Caitlyn Jenner, Amos Mac, Nicole Maines, Shane Ortega, Bamby Salcedo, and Alok Vaid-Menon.

In this documentary group portrait, these eleven transgender people share their stories in their own words. The film shows the individuality and diverse perspectives of activists, artists, athletes, models, porn stars, military personnel, and entrepreneurs. They recount their experiences of love, desire, family, prejudice, and rebellion.

Reception
In his film review for The Baltimore Sun, David Zurawik observed: "It's the stories of the not-so-famous individuals in this film… that most deeply resonate and, as a result, most successfully render a sense of transgender life.… As long as stories like these are eloquently told on TV, the possibility of understanding, acceptance and protection for those telling the stories increases dramatically."

See also

 History of transgender people in the United States
 List of transgender people
 The Black List (film series)

References

External links
 

2016 films
Films directed by Timothy Greenfield-Sanders
HBO documentary films
Transgender in the United States
Transgender-related documentary films
2016 LGBT-related films
Films about trans men
Films about trans women
2010s English-language films
2010s American films
American LGBT-related television films